Guillermo Davila (born 2 April 1949) is a Mexican former swimmer. He competed in the men's 400 metre individual medley at the 1964 Summer Olympics.

References

External links
 

1949 births
Living people
Mexican male medley swimmers
Olympic swimmers of Mexico
Swimmers at the 1964 Summer Olympics
Place of birth missing (living people)
20th-century Mexican people